Murchison may refer to:

Geographical features
 Lake Murchison, Tasmania, Australia
 Mount Murchison (Tasmania), Australia
 Murchison bioregion, a bioregion in Western Australia
 Murchison Falls, Uganda
 Murchison Glacier, New Zealand
 Murchison Island, an island in Lake Nipigon, Ontario, Canada
 Murchison Promontory, Canada
 Murchison Range, Stauning Alps, Greenland
 Murchison River (disambiguation)
 Murchison Sound, Greenland

National parks
 Iytwelepenty / Davenport Ranges National Park in Australia
 Murchison Falls National Park in Uganda
 Murchison Mountains, Fiordland National Park, New Zealand

Places

Australia
 Electoral district of Murchison-Eyre, a former state electorate of Western Australia
 Electoral division of Murchison, an electorate in the Tasmanian Legislative Council
 Murchison County, New South Wales
 Murchison, Victoria
 Shire of Murchison, a local government area in Western Australia
 Murchison Settlement, within the Shire

South Africa
 Murchison, KwaZulu-Natal
 Murchison, Limpopo

Other places
 Murchison, New Zealand
 Murchison, Texas, United States

Science
 Murchison Award, awarded by the Royal Geographical Society
 The Murchison Fund, awarded by the Geological Society of London
 Murchison Medal, awarded by the Geological Society of London
 Murchison Radio-astronomy Observatory, a designated radio quiet zone in Western Australia.
 Murchison Widefield Array, a radio telescope in Western Australia

Other uses
 Murchison (crater), a crater on the moon
 Murchison Building in Wilmington, North Carolina
 Murchison Highway, a road in Tasmania
 Murchison letter, a political scandal in 1888 in U.S.
 Murchison meteorite, which fell in 1969 near Murchison, Victoria, Australia
 The Murchison Murders which occurred in the 1930s in the Murchison region of Western Australia
 HMAS Murchison (K442), a warship of the Royal Australian Navy
 In re Murchison, a 1955 U.S. Supreme Court case during the Warren Court

People with the surname
 Alice Lynne Murchison, maiden name of Lindy Chamberlain-Creighton
 Carl Murchison (1887–1961), American psychologist
 Charles Murchison (politician) (1872–1952), British politician
 Charles Murchison (physician) (1830–1879), British physician
 Charlotte Murchison (1788–1869), Scottish geologist
 Christian Murchison (b. 1980), Singaporean racing driver
 Clint Murchison Jr. (1923–1987), Texas businessman
 Clint Murchison Sr. (1895–1969), Texas businessman
 Ira Murchison (1933–1994), American athlete
 Kenneth Murchison (1794–1854), British diplomat
 Kenneth MacKenzie Murchison (1872–1938), American architect
 Larrell Murchison (b. 1997), American football player
 Loren Murchison (1898–1979), American athlete
 Michael Murchison, Australian music producer
 Roderick Murchison (1792–1871), Scottish geologist for whom most of the geographical features above are directly or indirectly named
 Sally Fletcher-Murchison (b. 1933), American/Hawaiian ceramicist
 Tim Murchison (1896–1962), American baseball player
 William Murchison, American political columnist

See also
 Davenport Murchison Ranges bioregion
 Mount Murchison (disambiguation)